Battleford Court House  is the facility located in Battleford to provide a public forum used by the Saskatchewan legal system to adjudicate disputes and dispense civil, labour, administrative  and criminal justice under its laws.

History
In 1785, a fur trading post was built at Battleford. The Dominion government acquired the North-West the Hudson's Bay Company in 1870, and in 1873, created the North-West Mounted Police to maintain law and order. In 1876 Fort Battleford was established, a North-West Mounted Police post. Shortly thereafter, in 1877 the capital of the North West Territories moved from Fort Pitt to Battleford. In 1883 the capital of the North West Territories moved again, this time to Regina. In 1886 the Supreme Court of the North-West Territories with five puisne judges was established and resided in Regina. The original Provincial Regina Supreme Court House was constructed in 1895 and replaced in 1965. Saskatchewan became a province in 1905.  The Judicature Act, 1907, established the Supreme Court of Saskatchewan.  The Battleford Court House was designed by the architectural firm of Storey and Van Egmond, and constructed in 1907, marking the end of the old territorial court system.

The Canadian Northern Railway was built north of the North Saskatchewan River creating a rapidly growing community of North Battleford. Battleford was no longer the capital of the NWT, nor centre of law and order through the post at Fort Battleford. Battleford Court House is still the oldest court house in Saskatchewan and received Provincial Heritage Property status in 1978.  The court house still has sittings of the Court of Queen's Bench.

The building was designated a National Historic Site of Canada in 1981.

Saskatchewan Provincial Archives keeps the historical records of court proceedings.

Nearby

The Old Government House
Queen's Hotel
Land Titles (Registry) Office
Battleford Post Office
Town Hall/Opera House
1911 CNR Railway Station
1913 Hot Carl Commissioner
The Presbyterian Gardiner Church
St. Vital RC Church
The Merchants Bank of Canada
Fred Light Museum

See also
History of Saskatchewan Courts

References

External links 
Courts of Saskatchewan
The Encyclopedia of Saskatchewan | Details
History of the Battlefords - Historic Perspective
Virtual Saskatchewan - The Battlefords, in Saskatchewan, Canada

Saskatchewan courts
National Historic Sites in Saskatchewan
Courthouses in Canada
Canadian Register of Historic Places in Saskatchewan